Road North may refer to:

 Road North (Anguilla House of Assembly Constituency)
 Road North (film), Finnish film